Things We Think, But Never Speak is the debut studio album by Houston, Texas post-hardcore band Like Monroe. The album was released on October 14, 2014 through eOne Music and Good Fight. It was recorded at Think Sound Studios in Greensboro, North Carolina with producer Drew Fulk (Motionless in White, The Amity Affliction, For All Those Sleeping). Two music videos have been released for the tracks "The Hills" and "So Beautiful" directed by Aaron Marsh (Of Mice and Men).

Track listing

Critical reception

"While some may think the album’s energy steadily decreases as the songs go on, it’s actually more of a transition from loud and abrasive to calm and melodic. From metalcore to post-hardcore, raw screams to soulful singing, or shapeless chaos to structured verse-chorus form, Like Monroe manage to explore their roots, perfect their sound, and navigate the star system that is musical expression."
- The Aquarian Weekly

References

2014 debut albums
E1 Music albums
Post-hardcore albums by American artists